Echeveria subrigida is a species of succulent plant native to Mexico. It was first formally described in 1903 by Benjamin Lincoln Robinson and Henry Eliason Seaton. Its basionym is Cotyledon subrigida.

Etymology
Echeveria is named for Atanasio Echeverría y Godoy, a botanical illustrator who contributed to Flora Mexicana.

Subrigida means 'slightly stiff'.

References

External links

subrigida
Flora of Mexico